State Route 242 (SR 242) is a  east–west state highway located in the central part of the U.S. state of Georgia. It travels through portions of Washington and Jefferson counties.

Route description
SR 242 begins at an intersection with SR 24/SR 540 (Fall Line Freeway) in Sandersville in Washington County. The highway makes a quick turn towards downtown Sandersville as SR 242 Spur continues straight. The highway turns south onto SR 15 in the center of the city. After a  concurrency with SR 15, SR 242 turns east at Riddleville Road. The highway heads out of the city in a southeastern direction. Just before leaving Sandersville, it crosses a Sandersville Railroad line. Farther to the southeast, it crosses a Central of Georgia Railway line. The highway passes Jackson Cemetery before reaching Riddleville, where it intersects SR 231 (Harrison-Riddleville Road to the south and Riddleville-Davisboro Road to the north). After leaving town, SR 242 continues to the southeast, and gradually curves to the east and enters Jefferson County. It continues to the east to meet its eastern terminus, an intersection U.S. Route 221 (US 221)/US 319/SR 78/SR 171 in Bartow.

SR 242 is not part of the National Highway System.

History

SR 242 was established in 1946 along the same alignment as it runs today. In 1950, the section from the western terminus to a point just over halfway to Ridleville was paved. In 1953, the entire length of the highway was paved.

Major intersections

SR 242 Spur

State Route 242 Spur (Spur 242) is a  spur route of SR 242 west of Sandersville. It is known as North Saffold Road for its entire length.

It begins at an intersection with Kaolin Road and South Saffold Road in the southwestern part of the city near Kaolin Field, an airport serving the city. The highway heads northwest and leaves the city limits. It travels through a forested area and intersecting no paved roads until it curves to the north-northwest to its northern terminus, an intersection with the SR 242 mainline (West Church Street), only  from the latter's western terminus at SR 24.

See also

References

External links

242
Transportation in Washington County, Georgia
Transportation in Jefferson County, Georgia